Darko Franić (born 22 March 1987) is a Croatian retired football player, who last played for Zmaj Makarska.

Club career
A product of Hajduk Split Academy, Franić signed a professional contract with the club in July 2005. However, he never appeared for the club as he spent the following years on loans at smaller clubs in Druga HNL (second division) such as NK Zadar, NK Mosor and NK Junak Sinj.

He then spent the 2009–10 season on loan with Zagreb-based Hrvatski Dragovoljac with whom he finished third in the 2009–10 Druga HNL and won promotion to top level. At the end of season he was released from Hajduk and joined Dragovoljac on a free transfer, but only five months later he was released by the club in early January 2011.

References

External links
 
 
 

1987 births
Living people
Footballers from Split, Croatia
Association football goalkeepers
Croatian footballers
Croatia youth international footballers
NK Zadar players
NK Mosor players
NK Junak Sinj players
NK Hrvatski Dragovoljac players
HNK Zmaj Makarska players
Ungmennafélagið Sindri players
First Football League (Croatia) players
Croatian Football League players
2. deild karla players
Croatian expatriate footballers
Expatriate footballers in Iceland
Croatian expatriate sportspeople in Iceland